Mizouni (Arabic: الميزوني) is a Tunisian surname that may refer to 
Emna Mizouni (born 1987), Tunisian human rights activist and journalist 
Idris El Mizouni (born 2000), Tunisian football midfielder 
Myriam Mizouni (born 1958), Tunisian swimmer

Arabic-language surnames